A strobogrammatic number is a number whose numeral is rotationally symmetric, so that it appears the same when rotated 180 degrees. In other words, the numeral looks the same right-side up and upside down (e.g., 69, 96, 1001). A strobogrammatic prime is a strobogrammatic number that is also a prime number, i.e., a number that is only divisible by one and itself (e.g., 11). It is a type of ambigram, words and numbers that retain their meaning when viewed from a different perspective, such as palindromes.

Description
When written using standard characters (ASCII), the numbers, 0, 1, 8 are symmetrical around the horizontal axis, and 6 and 9 are the same as each other when rotated 180 degrees. In such a system, the first few strobogrammatic numbers are:

0, 1, 8, 11, 69, 88, 96, 101, 111, 181, 609, 619, 689, 808, 818, 888, 906, 916, 986, 1001, 1111, 1691, 1881, 1961, 6009, 6119, 6699, 6889, 6969, 8008, 8118, 8698, 8888, 8968, 9006, 9116, 9696, 9886, 9966, ... 

The first few strobogrammatic primes are:
11, 101, 181, 619, 16091, 18181, 19861, 61819, 116911, 119611, 160091, 169691, 191161, 196961, 686989, 688889, ... 

The years 1881 and 1961 were the most recent strobogrammatic years; the next strobogrammatic year will be 6009.

Although amateur aficionados of mathematics are quite interested in this concept, professional mathematicians generally are not. Like the concept of repunits and palindromic numbers, the concept of strobogrammatic numbers is base-dependent (expanding to base-sixteen, for example, produces the additional symmetries of 3/E; some variants of duodecimal systems also have this and a symmetrical x). Unlike palindromes, it is also font dependent. The concept of strobogrammatic numbers is not neatly expressible algebraically, the way that the concept of repunits is, or even the concept of palindromic numbers.

Nonstandard systems
The strobogrammatic properties of a given number vary by typeface. For instance, in an ornate serif type, the numbers 2 and 7 may be rotations of each other; however, in a seven-segment display emulator, this correspondence is lost, but 2 and 5 are both symmetrical. There are sets of glyphs for writing numbers in base 10, such as the Devanagari and Gurmukhi of India in which the numbers listed above are not strobogrammatic at all.

In binary, given a glyph for 1 consisting of a single line without hooks or serifs and a sufficiently symmetric glyph for 0, the strobogrammatic numbers are the same as the palindromic numbers and also the same as the dihedral numbers. In particular, all Mersenne numbers are strobogrammatic in binary. Dihedral primes that do not use 2 or 5 are also strobogrammatic primes in binary.

The natural numbers 0 and 1 are strobogrammatic in every base, with a sufficiently symmetric font, and they are the only natural numbers with this feature, since every natural number larger than one is represented by 10 in its own base.

In duodecimal, the strobogrammatic numbers are (using inverted two and three for ten and eleven, respectively)
0, 1, 8, 11, 2ᘔ, 3Ɛ, 69, 88, 96, ᘔ2, Ɛ3, 101, 111, 181, 20ᘔ, 21ᘔ, 28ᘔ, 30Ɛ, 31Ɛ, 38Ɛ, 609, 619, 689, 808, 818, 888, 906, 916, 986, ᘔ02, ᘔ12, ᘔ82, Ɛ03, Ɛ13, Ɛ83, ...

Examples of strobogrammatic primes in duodecimal are:
11, 3Ɛ, 111, 181, 30Ɛ, 12ᘔ1, 13Ɛ1, 311Ɛ, 396Ɛ, 3ᘔ2Ɛ, 11111, 11811, 130Ɛ1, 16191, 18881, 1Ɛ831, 3000Ɛ, 3181Ɛ, 328ᘔƐ, 331ƐƐ, 338ƐƐ, 3689Ɛ, 3818Ɛ, 3888Ɛ, ...

Upside down year 
The most recent upside down year was 1961, or 2002 if the number 2 is included, and before that were sequentially 1881 and 1691, unless leading zeroes are allowed to be arbitrarily added. In this case, 02020 would be the most recent upside down year. Before that were 1111 and 1001, and before that were 3-digit years, such as 986, 888, 689, 181, 101, etc.

Using only the digits 0, 1, 6, 8 and 9, the next upside-down year will not occur until 6009. Allowing for the numbers 2, 5 and 7, the next such year will be 2112. 

Mad magazine parodied the upside down year in March 1961.

References

External links

Classes of prime numbers
Integer sequences